The 20th Ohio Infantry Regiment was an infantry regiment in the Union Army during the American Civil War.

Service

Three-months regiment
The 20th Ohio Infantry Regiment was organized at Columbus, Ohio April through May 1861 in response to President Lincoln's call for 75,000 volunteers and mustered into service on May 23, 1861, under the command of Colonel Charles Whittlesey.  The regiment was ordered to western Virginia and attached to Kelley's Command.  It participated in action at Richter June 23 and the pursuit of Garnett July 15–16.  The regiment then performed duty along Baltimore & Ohio Railroad until August and mustered out on August 23, 1861.

Three-years regiment
The 20th Ohio Infantry was reorganized at Columbus August 19 through September 21, 1861, and mustered in for three years service on October 21, 1861, under the command of Colonel Charles Whittlesey.

The regiment was attached to 3rd Brigade, 3rd Division, Army of the Tennessee, February to May 1862. 2nd Brigade, 3rd Division, Army of the Tennessee, to July 1862. Unattached, District of Jackson, Tennessee, to November 1862. 2nd Brigade, 3rd Division, Right Wing, XIII Corps, Department of the Tennessee, to December 1862. 2nd Brigade, 3rd Division, XVII Corps, Army of the Tennessee and Army of Georgia, to July 1865.

The 20th Ohio Infantry mustered out of service at Louisville, Kentucky, on July 18, 1865.

Detailed service
The detailed service of the three-year 20th OVI is as follows:

1861
Moved to Camp King near Covington, Ky., and mustered in October 21. Duty at Covington and Newport, Ky., until February 11, 1862.

1862
Investment and capture of Fort Donelson, Tenn., February 14–16, 1862. Expedition toward Purdy and operations about Crump's Landing, Tenn., March 9–14. Battle of Shiloh, Tenn., April 6–7. Advance on and siege of Corinth, Miss., April 29 – May 30. Guard duty at Pittsburg Landing until June, and at Bolivar, Tenn., until September. Action at Bolivar August 30. Duty in the District of Jackson until November. Grant's Central Mississippi Campaign November 2, 1862, to January 10, 1863. Action at Holly Springs, Miss., December 21, 1862.

1863
Lafayette, Tenn., January 14, 1863. Moved to Memphis, Tenn., January 26, thence to Lake Providence, La., February 22, and duty there until April. Movement on Bruinsburg and turning Grand Gulf April 25–30. Battle of Port Gibson, Miss., May 1. Forty Hills and Hankinson's Ferry May 3–4. Battle of Raymond May 12. Jackson May 14. Champion Hill May 16. Siege of Vicksburg May 18 to July 4. Assaults on Vicksburg May 19–22. Surrender of Vicksburg July 4. Duty at Vicksburg until February 1864. Stevenson's Expedition to Monroe, La., August 20 – September 2, 1863. Expedition to Canton October 14–20. Bogue Chitto Creek October 17.

1864
Regiment reenlisted January 1, 1864. Meridian Campaign February 3 – March 2. Canton February 26. Veterans on furlough March and April. Moved to Clifton, Tenn., then marched to Ackworth, Ga., April 29 – June 9. Atlanta Campaign June 9 to September 8. Operations about Marietta and against Kennesaw Mountain June 10 – July 2. Assault on Kennesaw June 27, Nickajack Creek July 2–5. Howell's Ferry July 5. Chattahoochie River July 6–17. Leggett's or Bald Hill July 20–21. Battle of Atlanta July 22. Siege of Atlanta July 22 – August 25. Flank movement on Jonesboro August 25–30. Sandtown August 28. Battle of Jonesboro August 31 – September 2. Lovejoy's Station September 2–6. Operations against Hood in northern Georgia and northern Alabama September 29 – November 3. March to the sea November 15 – December 10. Siege of Savannah December 10–21.

1865
Campaign of the Carolinas January to April 1865. Pocotaligo, S.C., January 14. Barker's Mills, Whippy Swamp, February 2. Salkehatchie Swamp February 3–5. South Edisto River February 9. North Edisto River February 11–13. Columbia February 16–17. Battle of Bentonville, N.C., March 20–21. Occupation of Goldsboro March 24. Advance on Raleigh April 10–14. Occupation of Raleigh April 14. Bennett's House April 26. Surrender of Johnston and his army. March to Washington, D.C., via Richmond, Va., April 29 – May 20. Grand Review of the Armies May 24. Moved to Louisville, Ky., June.

Casualties
The regiment lost a total of 360 men during service; 2 officers and 87 enlisted men killed or mortally wounded, 4 officers and 267 enlisted men died of disease.

Commanders
 Colonel Charles Whittlesey
 Colonel Manning Ferguson Force
 Captain Francis M. Shaklee – commanded at Vicksburg after Col Force was promoted to brigade command

Notable members
 Private Henry Casey, Company C – Medal of Honor recipient for action at Vicksburg, May 22, 1863
 Brigadier General Manning F. Force – Medal of Honor recipient for action at the battle of Atlanta, July 22, 1864

See also
 List of Ohio Civil War units
 Ohio in the Civil War

Notes

References

External links
 Ohio in the Civil War: 20th Ohio Volunteer Infantry by Larry Stevens
 National flag of the 20th Ohio Infantry
 Regimental flag of the 20th Ohio Veteran Volunteer Infantry
 20th Ohio Infantry monument at Vicksburg

Military units and formations established in 1861
Military units and formations disestablished in 1865
Units and formations of the Union Army from Ohio
1861 establishments in Ohio